Mangani is a fictional species of great apes from the Tarzan novels by Edgar Rice Burroughs, and the invented language used by these apes.

Mangani may also refer to:

 Lameck Mangani, a Sambian politician representing Chipata Central in 2006
 Thomas Mangani (born 1987), a French soccer player
 Mangani Lal Mandal, an Indian politician
 The Mangani Festival in Karaikal district, Puducherry, India

See also 
 Mangan (disambiguation)
 Magnani
 Mangini
 Mangano
 Manganese
 Manganite (disambiguation)